Siege of Jerusalem, fall of Jerusalem, or sack of Jerusalem may refer to:

Battles
 Siege of Jebus (1010 BC), a siege by David, king of the United Kingdom of Israel, from biblical narrative 
 Sack of Jerusalem (925 BC), by Pharaoh Shishak, from biblical narrative
 Assyrian siege of Jerusalem (701 BCE) by Sennacherib, king of the Neo-Assyrian Empire
 Siege of Jerusalem (597 BC) by Nebuchadnezzar II of the Neo-Babylonian Empire, during Judah's first revolt against Babylon
 Siege of Jerusalem (587 BC) and destruction of the city and the First Temple by Nebuchadnezzar II, during Judah's second revolt against Babylon
 Siege of Jerusalem (162 BC) by Seleucid general Lysias
 Siege of Jerusalem (134 BC) by Seleucid king Antiochus VII Sidetes
 Siege of Jerusalem (67 BCE) by Aristobulus II of Judea against his brother, beginning the Hasmonean Civil War
 Siege of Jerusalem (64 BC) by Hyrcanus II and allied Nabataeans against his brother Aristobulus II
 Siege of Jerusalem (63 BC) by Pompey the Great, intervening in the Hasmonean Civil War
 Siege of Jerusalem (37 BC) by Herod the Great, ending Hasmonean rule over Judea
 Siege of Jerusalem (70 CE) and destruction of the city and the Second Temple by Titus, ending the major phase of the First Jewish–Roman War
 Sasanian conquest of Jerusalem (614) by Shahrbaraz during the Byzantine–Sasanian War of 602–628
 Siege of Jerusalem (636–637) by Khalid ibn al-Walid during the Muslim conquest of the Levant
 Capture of Jerusalem by Atsiz ibn Uwaq (1073 and 1077), Turcoman mercenary commander
 Siege of Jerusalem (1099) by the Crusaders in the First Crusade
 Siege of Jerusalem (1187) by Saladin, resulting in the capture of the city by the Ayyubid Muslims
 Siege of Jerusalem (1244) by the Khwarezmians, resulting in the recapture of the city from the Christians
 Siege of Jerusalem (1834) by Arab villagers during the 1834 Peasants' revolt in Palestine
 Battle of Jerusalem (1917), the city is captured by British and Commonwealth forces during the Sinai and Palestine campaign of World War I
 Battle for Jerusalem during the 1948 Arab–Israeli War
 Capture of East Jerusalem by Israel (1967), during the Six-Day War

Other uses
 Siege of Jerusalem (poem), a 14th-century poem depicting the events of 70 CE
 The Siege of Jerusalem, a 1976 board wargame that simulates the events of 70 CE

See also
 Timeline of Jerusalem

Lists of battles